James A. Moran (July 29, 1921 – February 1, 2005) was an American football coach. He was the head football coach at King's College in Wilkes-Barre, Pennsylvania, a position he held from 1952 to 1962.

As a college athlete, he played in the 1942 Sugar Bowl for Fordham and the 1949 Sun Bowl for West Virginia, all while serving a four-year stint in the military during World War II.

Head coaching record

References

1921 births
2005 deaths
Fordham Rams football players
King's College Monarchs football coaches
West Virginia Mountaineers football players
High school football coaches in Pennsylvania
Sportspeople from Wilkes-Barre, Pennsylvania
Players of American football from Pennsylvania